Mother Earth is the seventh studio album by Japanese J-pop singer and songwriter Maki Ohguro. It was released on 9 September 1998 under B-Gram Records. For the first time the arranger Takeshi became the main producer of this album.

Album consist of the only one previously released singles, Ne! ~Onna Jounetsu~.

Two tracks out of thirteen are instrumental, composed by Maki herself and Takeshi Hayama.

The album reached No. 1 in its first week on the Oricon chart. The album sold 714,000 copies. This is last time when her album reached No.1 in Oricon weekly charts.

It's her last studio album released in B-Gram Records. Before moving to new label EMI Japan by Universal Music Japan, she released in 1999 her second compilation album Maki Ohguro Best of Best ~All Singles Collection~.

Track listing
All tracks arranged by Takeshi Hayama.

In media
Kono Yami wo Tsukinukeru: theme song for Toto Super Athletics Convention 1998
Ne! ~Onna Jounetsu~: commercial song of Kanebo Cosmetics's Testimo II

References

Being Inc. albums
Japanese-language albums
1998 albums
Maki Ohguro albums